Coffea affinis is a species of plant from the family Rubiaceae. It is a largely unknown coffee bean found in West Africa.

References

affinis
Flora of West Tropical Africa
Taxa named by Émile Auguste Joseph De Wildeman